Anuja is a village in West Champaran district in the Indian state of Bihar.

Demographics
 India census, Anuja had a population of 5561 in 1022 households. Males constitute 51.86% of the population and females 48.13%. Anuja has an average literacy rate of 40%, lower than the national average of 74%: male literacy is 63.9%, and female literacy is 36%. In Anuja, 21.5% of the population is under 6 years of age.

References

Villages in West Champaran district